Yung Shue Wan is the main population centre on Lamma Island, Hong Kong. It has a population of approximately 6,000.

Administration
Yung Shue Wan is a recognized village under the New Territories Small House Policy.

Features
The village is a mix of residential properties, shops and restaurants. Yung Shue Wan gives a Mediterranean feeling when walking through it. In addition to the indigenous residents, the quiet and laid-back lifestyle make it an attractive and popular living location for middle-class commuters. It is popular with expatriates.

There is a Tin Hau Temple in Yung Shue Wan.

Transportation
Yung Shue Wan can be reached by ferry from the Outlying Islands Ferry Pier No. 4 in Central, which takes about 25 minutes, or from Aberdeen, which takes about 35 minutes.

Lamma Island ferry collision

On 1 October 2012, at approximately 20:20 HKT, a ferry and another passenger vessel collided off Yung Shue Wan, Lamma Island, Hong Kong. The day was the National Day of the People's Republic of China, and one of the ships was headed for the commemorative firework display, scheduled to take place half an hour later. With 39 killed and more than 100 injured, the incident was the deadliest maritime disaster in Hong Kong since 1971.

Gallery

See also
 List of places in Hong Kong
 Sha Po Old Village
 Sok Kwu Wan

References

External links

 Delineation of area of existing village Yung Shue Wan (Lamma North) for election of resident representative (2019 to 2022)
 Transport Department site giving routes and timetables

Bays of Hong Kong
Lamma Island
Populated places in Hong Kong
Villages in Islands District, Hong Kong